Pertusaria diluta is a species of crustose lichen in the family Pertusariaceae, first found in inland rainforests of British Columbia.

References

Further reading
 Schmitt, Imke, et al. "Gyalectoid Pertusaria species form a sister-clade to Coccotrema (Ostropomycetidae, Ascomycota) and comprise the new lichen genus Gyalectaria." Mycology 1.1 (2010): 75–83.

diluta
Lichen species
Lichens described in 2009
Lichens of Western Canada
Fungi without expected TNC conservation status